Campfire Songs:  The Popular, Obscure and Unknown Recordings of 10,000 Maniacs is a compilation album by American alternative rock band 10,000 Maniacs, released in 2004. It includes their biggest hits, B-sides and unreleased recordings from the Natalie Merchant era. Despite the album's title, the collection does not include "A Campfire Song" from In My Tribe (1987).

Track listing

Notes
"Tension" originally appeared on the EP Human Conflict Number Five. The version present on Campfire Songs is from Secrets of the I Ching.

Personnel
10,000 Maniacs
Jerome Augustyniak – drums, percussion (except CD 1, track 1)
Robert Buck – guitars, mandolin, steel, banjo, devices, synthesizer
Dennis Drew – organ, piano, accordion
Steven Gustafson – guitar, bass guitar
John Lombardo – guitars, bass guitar, occasional vocals (CD 1, tracks 1–4 and CD 2, tracks 1–2)
Natalie Merchant – vocals, piano

Technical
10,000 Maniacs – producer, compilation
Bill Waldman – producer
Joe Boyd – producer
Peter Asher – producer
Paul Fox – producer
Gary Smith – producer
Lenny Kaye – producer
Natalie Merchant – compilation, art direction
Dan Hersch – remastering
Bill Inglot – remastering
Steve Woolard – discographical annotation
Julee Stover – editorial supervision
Mary Lynch – design assistance

References

10,000 Maniacs compilation albums
Albums produced by Joe Boyd
Albums produced by Peter Asher
B-side compilation albums
2004 compilation albums
Elektra Records compilation albums